Flavius Anicius Olybrius was a Roman politician. He was appointed to the post of consul for the year 526, which he held without a colleague.

Biography 
Olybrius, most certainly a westerner, was a member of the prestigious Anicius family. Following his tenure as consul, which was recognised both in the East and in the West, he held the rank of patricius. He was in Rome when the Ostrogothic king Totila captured the city. Olybrius, Anicius Maximus (who had been consul in 523), Rufius Gennadius Probus Orestes (who had been consul in 530) and other patricii sought refuge in Old St. Peter's Basilica. Captured and sent to Campania, he was still there when Narses conquered Rome in 552; the senators were preparing to return to Rome, but the Goths who guarded them, enraged by the death of Totila, killed them all.

Notes 

6th-century Italo-Roman people
6th-century Roman consuls
Imperial Roman consuls